Omiodes confusalis is a moth in the family Crambidae. It was described by Paul Dognin in 1905. It is found in Ecuador, Venezuela, Trinidad, Mexico, Panama and Costa Rica.

References

Moths described in 1905
confusalis